Hydrox is a cream-filled chocolate sandwich cookie currently owned and manufactured by Leaf Brands. It debuted in the United States in 1908, and was manufactured by Sunshine Biscuits for over 90 years. Hydrox was largely discontinued in 1999, three years after Sunshine was acquired by Keebler, which was later acquired by Kellogg's. In September 2015, the product was reintroduced by Leaf Brands.

Oreo was created in 1912 as an imitation of Hydrox. Oreo eventually eclipsed Hydrox in popularity, which resulted in the Hydrox cookies being perceived as an Oreo off-brand. Compared to Oreos, Hydrox cookies have a less sweet filling and a crunchier cookie shell that is reportedly less soggy in milk.

History 
In 1908, the cookie's creation was inspired by "purity and goodness", with a name derived from the hydrogen and oxygen elements within the water molecule.

Sunshine Biscuits was purchased by Keebler in 1996, and in 1999, Keebler replaced Hydrox with a similar but reformulated product called "Droxies". Keebler was acquired by Kellogg's in 2001, and Kellogg's removed Droxies from the market in 2003. Kellogg's then marketed a similar chocolate sandwich cookie under the Famous Amos brand, along with sandwich cookies of other flavors, but also discontinued the line.

On the cookie's 100th anniversary, Kellogg's resumed distribution of Hydrox under the Sunshine label in late August 2008 in direct response to 1,300 phone calls from fans as well as an online petition with 1,000 signatures, a Hydrox fan website with the essay "Noncomformists don't eat Oreos", and dozens of forum posts, asking that production resume. The cookies were available nationally for a limited time, and less than one year later Kellogg's removed Hydrox from their web site.

The Carvel ice cream franchise sold ice-cream goods manufactured with Hydrox cookie crumbs until 2012. Carvel used the cookie's all-kosher status as a selling point, because the original Oreo recipe used lard. The cookies were not specifically mentioned by name on the Carvel website, but they were identified as "hydrox" (lower-case "h") on the in-store posters. Carvel currently uses Oreo cookies in its ice cream goods.

In 2014, Leaf Brands registered the "Hydrox" trademark, which had been abandoned by former owner Kellogg's. Leaf began production of its version of Hydrox on September 4, 2015, at the company’s facility in Vernon, California.
In 2017, the recipe was changed to remove artificial flavors that had been used for 50 years. and the company obtained non-GMO certification.

Leaf Brands filed a complaint with the US Federal Trade Commission in 2018 against Mondelez International, maker of Oreo cookies, for hiding Hydrox cookies from customers on store shelves.

See also

Sandwich cookie
Newman-O's
Oreo
Domino (cookie)

References

External links
 
 The Hydrox Cookie Page

Brand name cookies
Cookie sandwiches
Products introduced in 1908
Kosher food